Parliamentary elections were held in Bophuthatswana in October 1982. The Bophuthatswana Democratic Party won all 72 of the elected seats in the National Assembly.

Results

References

Bophuthatswana
Elections in Bophuthatswana
October 1982 events in Africa